Jamsil may refer to:

 Jamsil Arena, an indoor sporting venue in Seoul, South Korea
 Jamsil Baseball Stadium, in Seoul, South Korea
 Jamsil Station, a station on the Seoul Metropolitan Subway
 Jamsil Students' Gymnasium, an indoor sporting venue in Seoul, South Korea
 Jamsil-dong, a neighbourhood in Seoul